KNTS-LP, virtual channel 17 (UHF digital channel 19), was a low-powered AMGTV-affiliated television station licensed to Natchitoches, Louisiana, United States. It was founded in 1995 but launched over the air in 1998 by CP-Tel Network Services, a local Internet services provider, and it was managed by Richard Gill. It was originally affiliated with America One and received cable coverage one month after it began broadcasting.

Most recently, the station broadcast religious programs including The 700 Club weekdays at noon.

At one point, KNTS-LP was the flagship station for the Northwestern State University Demons. Despite its broadcast in analog, KNTS-LP had a digital translator, KNYS-LD (virtual and UHF digital channel 27).

Sanphyl Broadcast Network surrendered the licenses for KNTS-LP and KNYS-LD to the Federal Communications Commission on February 15, 2021; the FCC cancelled both licenses the same day.

External links
KNTS-LP on Facebook
KNTS 17 Website

Television stations in Louisiana
Low-power television stations in the United States
Television channels and stations established in 1997
1997 establishments in Louisiana
Defunct television stations in the United States
Television channels and stations disestablished in 2021
2021 disestablishments in Louisiana
Defunct mass media in Louisiana